Vasiļjevs (feminine: Vasiļjeva) is a Latvian patronymic surname of Russian origin (from Russian surname Vasilyev). Individuals with the surname include:

Deniss Vasiļjevs, (born 1999), Latvian figure skater;
Edmunds Vasiļjevs (born 1954), Latvian ice hockey player;
Haralds Vasiļjevs (born 1952), Latvian ice hockey player and coach;
Herberts Vasiļjevs (born 1976), Latvian ice hockey player

See also 
Vasilyev

Surnames of Russian origin
Latvian-language masculine surnames
Patronymic surnames

lv:Vasiļjevs